Scoparia pusillula is a moth in the family Crambidae. It was described by Eugene G. Munroe in 1995 and is found in Panama, where it is common on the Atlantic side of the country.

Adults are small and narrow winged, with a pattern similar to that of Toulgoetodes tersella.

References

Moths described in 1995
Scorparia